Balanataman Rural LLG is a local-level government (LLG) of East New Britain Province, Papua New Guinea.

Wards
01. Ratung
02. Pilapila
03. Karavia
04. Ratavul
05. Volavolo
06. Nonga
07. Tavui No.1
08. Tavui No.2
09. Tavui No.3
10. Malaguna No.1
11. Malaguna No.2
12. Malaguna No.3
13. Iawakaka
14. Rapolo
15. Raluan No.1
16. Raluan No.2
17. Tavana
18. Valaur
83. Nonga Base Hospital

References

Local-level governments of East New Britain Province